Cima de Barna is a mountain of the Lepontine Alps, located on the Swiss-Italian border. It is situated south of Pass de Balniscio.

References

External links
 Cima de Berna on Hikr

Mountains of the Alps
Mountains of Switzerland
Two-thousanders of Italy
Italy–Switzerland border
International mountains of Europe
Mountains of Graubünden
Lepontine Alps
Two-thousanders of Switzerland